Tawau Japanese War Memorial is a former Japanese cemetery in Tawau in the Malaysian state of Sabah which now has been transformed into a memorial.

History 
Following the Anglo-Japanese Treaty of 1902, many Japanese businessmen began to settle in the surrounding area of Tawau. On 19 January 1916, a Japanese Nippon Industrial Company bought a 240 acres for rubber plantation and another 607 hectares of adjacent land. The plantation known as "Kuhara Estate of Rubber and Manila Hemp" was established under the name of the owner, Fanosuke Kuhara. Another Japanese plantation known as "Kubota Estate" belonged to Kubota Umeme,  specialises in coconut and has operated since 1916. According to statistics from 1921, 191 Japanese resided in Tawau, while before the outbreak of the Second World War there were 1,175.

Due to the growing number of the Japanese, the cemetery was built before the Second World War and used by the Japanese community as a burial site. The vast majority of the people buried here died before the Second World War.

Location 

This site is located on the road of Tanjung Batu Street, in the west of Tawau golf course. The site is fenced on three sides. Only a few relics recall its original function as a cemetery. One of the grave listed five Japanese names such as Sadatoshi Ohta, Ryoichi Muromoto, Isao Ohtomo, Koji Matsuo and Takeshi Kusumoto.

On the back of one of the monument built after the Second World War, several rows of Japanese characters can be seen whose translation as follows:

References

Further reading

Literature 
 Ken Goodlet: Tawau - The Making of a Tropical Community, Opus Publications, 2010

External links 
 

World War II memorials
Monuments and memorials in Sabah
Japan–Malaysia relations